Vladimir Alexandrovich Timoshinin (born July 12, 1970, in Moscow) is a retired diver from Russia, who is best known for winning the gold medal in the men's 10 m platform at the 1991 European Championships in Athens, Greece.

Timoshinin represented the Soviet Union at the 1988 Summer Olympics, and Russia at the 1996 Summer Olympics (Atlanta, Georgia). He was affiliated with the Central Sport Klub Army in Moscow during his career.

His daughter is Yulia Timoshinina.

References
 sports-reference

1970 births
Living people
Russian male divers
Divers at the 1988 Summer Olympics
Divers at the 1996 Summer Olympics
Olympic divers of the Soviet Union
Olympic divers of Russia
Divers from Moscow
World Aquatics Championships medalists in diving